George Thompson may refer to:

Politics
George Lowther Thompson (1786–1841), Member of Parliament (MP) for Haslemere, and Yarmouth, Isle of Wight
George Thompson (abolitionist) (1804–1878), British anti-slavery lecturer and MP for Tower Hamlets
George Thompson (shipowner) (1804–1895), founder of the Aberdeen Line and Liberal MP for Aberdeen
George W. Thompson (politician) (1806–1888), Virginia politician and lawyer
George L. Thompson (1864–1941), New York politician
George F. Thompson (1870–1948), New York politician
George Thompson (Wisconsin politician) (1918–1982), Attorney General of Wisconsin
George Thompson (Scottish National Party politician) (1928–2016), Scottish National Party politician, MP for Galloway
George Thompson (Australian politician) (born 1945), former Australian politician
George Henry Thompson (1848–1940), member of the Queensland Legislative Council

Sports
George Thompson (basketball) (born 1947), American basketball player
George Thompson (cricketer) (1877–1943), English Test cricketer

George Thompson (footballer, born 1884) (1884–?), winger for Sheffield United and Derby County in the 1900s, and manager for Luton Town
George Thompson (footballer, born 1895) (1895–?), played for Burnley, Rotherham and Ashington in the 1920s

George Thompson (footballer, born 1900) (1900–1968), goalkeeper for York City and Southampton in the 1920s

George Thompson (footballer, born 1926) (1926–2004), goalkeeper for Scunthorpe United, Preston North End, Manchester City and Carlisle United in 1950s and 1960s
George Thompson (Australian footballer) (1906–1986), Australian rules footballer
George Thompson (American football) (1899–1939), American football player

Other
George Thompson (aviator) (1888–1912), one of Colorado's earliest aviators
George Thompson (engineer) (1839–1876), British engineer who served in Paraguay during the Paraguayan War
George Thompson (traveller), author of a two-volume travelogue Travels and Adventures in South Africa
George Thompson (VC) (1920–1945), Scottish recipient of the Victoria Cross
George Thompson, musical director of the Grimethorpe Colliery Band, early 1950s to 1972
George A. Thompson (businessman) (1921–2000), American inventor and businessman
George A. Thompson (geologist) (1919–2017), Stanford geophysicist, winner of the Penrose Medal in 2008
George Peter Thompson (1819–1889), Liberian-born educator, clergyman and missionary
George W. Thompson (Medal of Honor) (1847–?), American soldier and recipient of the Medal of Honor
George William Thompson (born 1956), American international trade attorney and adjunct professor

See also 
George Thomson (disambiguation)
Georgia Thompson, Wisconsin civil servant
Georgie Thompson, English television presenter